Ephel Duath was an Italian avant garde metal/hardcore punk band, formed in 1998 in Padua, Italy. They have had a constantly changing line-up, with guitarist and songwriter Davide Tiso being the only original member. To date, they have released one demo, five studio albums and two remix albums. Their most recent studio album, Hemmed By Light, Shaped By Darkness, was released in 2013.

History
Ephel Duath was formed in 1998 as a two-man group and taking their name after the fictional mountain range in J.R.R. Tolkien's book The Lord of the Rings. Their debut release was Phormula, on Code666. Following Phormula'''s release, they signed to Elitist Records (a sub-division of Earache), and repackaged the debut with three tracks from the 1998 demo, Opera, and two remixes.  The album was released in 2001 as Rephormula.

Founder Davide Tiso recruited a diverse set of musicians with backgrounds in hardcore punk, progressive rock, jazz, blues, funk and pop.  The first album with this lineup was 2003's The Painter's Palette. The album showcased an unorthodox combination of hardcore punk and jazz fusion. In an interview in May 2003, Kerrang! magazine described the band as "supermodels playing Dillinger Escape Plan".

A new album, Pain Necessary to Know, was released in late 2005. After recording the album, drummer Davide Piovesan quit the band, and was replaced first by Sergio Ponti in 2006 and then by Andrea Rabuini in 2007. Ephel Duath later dismissed bassist Fabio Fecchio, with the band stating that they intended to remain a trio to "explore more experimental music dimensions".

On November 27, 2008, Ephel Duath announced that Luciano George Lorusso had quit the band and had been replaced by professional poker player Guillermo Gonzales. They also released a new song, "Guardian", on their MySpace webpage. In January 2009, Ephel Duath released Through My Dog's Eyes, featuring drummer Marco Minnemann and Dillinger Escape Plan's Ben Weinman.  Weinman composed "electronics" on the song "Bark Loud". On June 4, 2009, Davide Tiso announced that Ephel Duath had parted ways with Earache Records and that he was "thrilled" to be off the label.

From the band's departure from Earache until late 2011, Tiso was the sole member of Ephel Duath.  He explained that this was due to the cost of hiring musicians out of his own pocket. He claimed to have received only $400 from his record label. Regarding how the financial difficulties affected the band, Tiso said that the former members of Ephel Duath "were often complaining, without even realizing how many problems I was hiding in front of their eyes. Now it's just me, and I'm pretty comfortable like this."  

In November 2011, Tiso announced (via Facebook) that Ephel Duath signed with Agonia Records (Poland) for the release of an EP and two full-length albums. The EP, called On Death And Cosmos, was recorded in January 2012 at Sharkbyte Studios in Oakland, California, and released in summer 2012. Erik Rutan mixed the album at his Mana Recording Studio and Alan Douches mastered it at West West Side Music in New York. In December 2011, a new line-up was announced consisting of Karyn Crisis (Tiso's wife), Steve Di Giorgio and Marco Minnemann (who has previously worked with the band).

The band completed their fifth full-length album, Hemmed By Light, Shaped By Darkness, again with producer Erik Rutan at Mana Recording Studios, and released it in late 2013.  The black and white cover artwork was completed by artists Dehn Sora and Aeron Alfrey.

In December 2014, front man Davide Tiso announced the end of Ephel Duath.

Members
Final Lineup
Davide Tiso – guitar, bass, keyboards, backing vocals (1998–2014)
Karyn Crisis - vocals (2011-2014)
Bryan Beller - bass (2012-2014)
Marco Minnemann - drums (2008–2009, 2011–2014)

Former members
Demetrio Scopelliti - live guitar (2012–2014)
Giuliano Mogicato – vocals, bass, guitar, keyboards (1998–2002)
Davide Tolomei – vocals (2003–2004)
Davide Piovesan – drums (2003–2005)
Fabio Fecchio – bass (2003–2006)
Riccardo Pasini – keyboards (2003–2005)
Sergio Ponti – drums (2006–2007)
Luciano George Lorusso – vocals (2003–2008)
Guillermo Gonzales - vocals (2008–2009)
Andrea Rabuini – live drums (2007–2009)
Steve Di Giorgio - bass (2011-2012)

Timeline

 Discography 
Demo albums
 Opera (1998)

Studio albums
 Phormula (2000)
 Rephormula (2002)
 The Painter's Palette (2003)
 Pain Necessary to Know (2005)
 Through My Dog's Eyes (2009)
 Hemmed By Light, Shaped By Darkness (2013)

Extended plays
 On Death and Cosmos (2012)

Remix albums
 Pain Remixes the Known (2007)

Singles and Music Videos
 The Embossed (2002)
 The Passage'' (2003)

References

External links
Ephel Duath on Myspace
Interview on Avantgarde-metal.com

Avant-garde metal musical groups
Italian progressive metal musical groups
Musical groups established in 1998
Earache Records artists
Things named after Tolkien works